Treptow was a former borough in the southeast of Berlin. It merged with Köpenick to form Treptow-Köpenick in 2001.

Geography
The district was composed by the localities of Alt-Treptow, Plänterwald, Baumschulenweg, Niederschöneweide, Johannisthal, Adlershof, Altglienicke and Bohnsdorf.

Photo gallery

See also

Alt-Treptow

External links

Former boroughs of Berlin
Treptow-Köpenick